St Bede's College, Bentleigh East (formerly St James College) is a campus of St Bede's College that caters for years 7–10, located in Bentleigh East, a suburb of Melbourne, Australia. The campus has around 470 students, and is administered by the De La Salle Brothers, a teaching order of Christian Brothers. The campus director  is Stephen Pooley. At the beginning of 2021, St James College was amalgamated into St Bede's College in Mentone, operating as a second campus of that college.

History 
The school opened in 1970 in association with the De La Salle Brothers as St James Regional College, in order to serve six Catholic parishes in a fast-growing area of suburban Melbourne, and moved from temporary accommodations to the first buildings on its present campus in 1971. By 1984, it was serving four Catholic additional parishes. In early 2021, it became a campus of St Bede's College, Mentone, adopting its name and uniform.

Some of the school's students have gone on to play in Australian sports such as Australian Rules Football.
St Peters Church Bentleigh East often hosts masses for the students at the College.https://newsletters.naavi.com/i/x5BbLV5/issue-12/page/2

College principals

Alumni 

 Ljubo Miličević - Former Melbourne Victory, Newcastle Jets HAL player
 Nick Staikos - State Member for Bentleigh (2014–)
 Steve Staikos - Mayor of City of Kingston (2010–2011)
 Liam Sumner - AFL player for Carlton Football Club
 Luke Beveridge - AFL Premiership coach

See also 
 De La Salle College, Malvern
 Mentone Girls Grammar
 John Paul College (Melbourne).

References

External links 
St Bede's College, Bentleigh East

Boys' schools in Victoria (Australia)
Bentleigh East
Catholic secondary schools in Melbourne
Educational institutions established in 1970
1970 establishments in Australia
Buildings and structures in the City of Glen Eira